The A 13 road is an A-Grade trunk road in Sri Lanka. It connects the Galkulama with Anuradhapura.

References

Highways in Sri Lanka